Electoral results for the Division of Fraser may refer to:

 Electoral results for the Division of Fraser (Australian Capital Territory), a former federal electoral division located in the Australian Capital Territory
 Electoral results for the Division of Fraser (Victoria), a current federal electoral division located in Victoria